Aberfeldy railway station served the village of Aberfeldy in Scotland.

History
The station was opened on 3 July 1865 by the Inverness and Perth Junction Railway when it opened the branch line from Ballinluig to Aberfeldy.

To the north west of the station was a goods yard and shed, with a 5 ton crane, able to take live stock, horse boxes and cattle vans. To the south of the line as it left the station was a small engine shed and turntable.

The station was host to a LMS caravan  from 1935 to 1939. A camping coach was also positioned here by the Scottish Region from 1952 to 1963.

The station closed to freight and passengers on 3 May 1965.

The site today

The old station is now demolished, replaced by a parking area.

References

Bibliography

Further reading

External links 
 RAILSCOT on Aberfeldy Branch
 Aberfeldy station on navigable O. S. map

Disused railway stations in Perth and Kinross
Railway stations in Great Britain opened in 1865
Railway stations in Great Britain closed in 1965
Former Highland Railway stations
Beeching closures in Scotland
1861 establishments in Scotland
1965 disestablishments in Scotland
Aberfeldy, Perth and Kinross